Águila or Aguila is Spanish for "eagle". It may refer to:

Places
El Aguila, Valle del Cauca, a town and municipality in Colombia
Aguila, Arizona, United States

Ships
Chilean brigantine Águila (1796), the first ship of the Chilean Navy
SS Aguila, a British passenger liner built in 1917 and sunk in 1941

Firearms
 .17 PMC/Aguila, a type of ammunition cartridge
 Aguila Ammunition, a Mexican Ammunition manufacturer

Other uses
 Águila, a beer made by Bavaria Brewery in Colombia
 C.D. Águila, a Salvadoran football club
 Compañía Mexicana de Petróleo El Aguila SA, a former Mexican oil company, now Pemex
 El Aguila, a character in the Marvel Comics universe
 Mr. Águila (born 1978), Mexican professional wrestler
 Aguila (film), a 1980 Filipino film

People
Aguila Saleh Issa (born 1944), Libyan jurist and politician
Chris Aguila (born 1979), American major league baseball player
Cynthia del Águila (born 1959), Guatemalan teacher and politician
Juan del Águila (1545–1602), Spanish general
Roberto Solis or Pancho Aguila (born 1945), American fugitive and poet

See also
Agila (disambiguation)
Aquila (disambiguation)
Aguilar (disambiguation)
Águila o sol, a 1937 Mexican film
Orden del Águila Azteca, the highest decoration awarded to foreigners in Mexico
Patrulla Águila, an aerobatic demonstration team of the Spanish Air Force
Piedra del Águila Dam, a dam on the Limay River, Patagonia, Argentina
Pico del Águila, a Mexican mountain peak near Mexico City
Águila Islet, islet belonging to Chile and the southernmost point of South America